Warren Luff (born 21 April 1976), is best known as a race driver, stunt driver and driver training instructor. He is the son of well-known driver training instructor Ian Luff. He currently co-drives for Walkinshaw Andretti United in the Repco Supercars Championship with Nick Percat in the No. 2 Holden ZB Commodore.

After starting in the Improved Production category in the early 1990s, he progressed to the Australian Super Touring Championship in 1997 & 1998 and his V8 Supercar debut was at the 1999 Queensland 500. He then joined various one make categories with great success. He was champion of the Australian Mitsubishi Mirage Cup in 1999 and 2000, then champion in the Brute Utes series in 2002 and 2003, as well as one off's in the Porsche 944 Challenge in 2003 and the Australian Mini Challenge in 2009 and 2010 seasons.

On 16 September 2012, Luff won his first ever V8 Supercars race, teaming up with Vodafone's Craig Lowndes at the Sandown 500. On 7 October 2012, Luff and Lowndes finished 3rd in the Supercheap Bathurst 1000, the 50th running of the event, where their car ran special Peter Brock livery to commemorate the history of Bathurst and Lowndes' mentor. In 2013, again with Lowndes, Luff won the inaugural Enduro Cup. For 2014 Luff teamed up with Garth Tander to contest the 2014 Pirtek Enduro Cup for the Holden Racing Team. Tander and Luff joined forces again in 2015, and despite not winning a race, won the 2015 Enduro Cup, resulting in Luff becoming the first driver to win the award twice.

Career results

Complete Bathurst 1000 results

* Super Touring race

Complete Bathurst 24 Hour results

Complete Bathurst 12 Hour results

References

External links
 Official V8 Supercars Profile
 NMD Australia Profile
 
 Conrod V8 Database Profile

1976 births
Living people
Racing drivers from Sydney
Supercars Championship drivers
V8SuperTourer drivers
Australian Endurance Championship drivers
Phoenix Racing drivers
Team Joest drivers
Andretti Autosport drivers
United Autosports drivers
Dick Johnson Racing drivers
Nürburgring 24 Hours drivers
McLaren Racing drivers
Craft-Bamboo Racing drivers